Catocala sultana is a moth of the family Erebidae. It is found in  Tunisia, Morocco and Algeria.

Some authors consider it a subspecies (Catocala optata sultana) or even a form of Catocala optata.

References

sultana
Moths described in 1910
Moths of Africa